"Once You've Had the Best" is a ballad written and originally recorded by Johnny Paycheck.   It is best remembered for the rendition recorded by George Jones, who scored a #3 hit with it in late 1973.  "Once You've Had the Best" originally appeared on Paycheck's 1973 album Mr. Lovemaker.  The Jones version, which contains a more optimistic tone, became the singer's second Top 5 solo hit with Epic Records.  Paycheck's first big break came when he was hired as the bass player for Jones' backing band the Jones Boys in the mid 1960s before beginning his own successful solo career a few years later.  The pair would also record a duet album, Double Trouble, in 1980.  "Once You've Had the Best" became a live staple for Jones, who almost always performed the song after the show opener as a gesture to his audience.

Discography

1973 songs
Songs written by Johnny Paycheck
Song recordings produced by Billy Sherrill